Ian Chapman may refer to:

 Ian Chapman (cyclist) (born 1939), Australian Olympic cyclist
 Ian Chapman (footballer) (born 1970), English footballer
 Ian Chapman (professor), chief executive of the United Kingdom Atomic Energy Authority